Jenny Liou (born June 7, 1985) is an American mixed martial artist signed with the Invicta, where she competes in the strawweight division.

Mixed martial arts record

|-
| Loss
| align=center| 6–5
| Andrea Lee
| KO (punches)
| Invicta FC 21: Anderson vs. Tweet
| 
| align=center| 1
| align=center| 1:14
| Kansas City, Missouri
| 
|-
| Loss
| align=center| 6–4
| Sarah D'Alelio
| Decision (unanimous)
| Super Fight League 50: Seattle vs. Los Angeles
| 
| align=center| 3
| align=center| 5:00
| Tacoma, Washington
| 
|-
| Win
| align=center| 6–3
| Shannon Sinn
| Submission (armbar)
| SCL 49: Revenge
| 
| align=center| 3
| align=center| 2:53
| Denver, Colorado
| 
|-
| Win
| align=center| 5–3
| Jaymee Jones
| Submission (armbar)
| Xtreme Fighting League 28
| 
| align=center| 1
| align=center| 0:59
| Tulsa, Oklahoma
| 
|-
| Win
| align=center| 4–3
| Heather Denny
| Submission (armbar)
| Super Fight League America 6
| 
| align=center| 1
| align=center| 4:01
| Tacoma, Washington
| 
|-
| Loss
| align=center| 3–3
| Susy Watson
| TKO (punches)
| KOTC Awakening
| 
| align=center| 3
| align=center| 1:17
| Worley, Idaho
| 
|-
| Loss
| align=center| 3–2
| Lacey Schuckman
| TKO (punches)
| Invicta FC 12: Kankaanpää vs. Souza
| 
| align=center| 1
| align=center| 1:53
| Kansas City, Missouri
| 
|-
| Win
| align=center| 3–1
| Susy Watson
| Decision (unanimous)
| Super Fight League America 2
| 
| align=center|3
| align=center|5:00
| Tacoma, Washington
|
|-
| Loss
| align=center| 2–1
| Jamie Moyle
| Decision (unanimous)
| Invicta FC 9: Honchak vs. Hashi
| 
| align=center|3
| align=center|5:00
| Davenport, Iowa
|
|-
| Win
| align=center| 2–0
| Jillian Lybarger
| Decision (unanimous)
| KOTC Radar Lock
| 
| align=center|3
| align=center|5:00
| Scottsdale, Arizona
|
|-
| Win
| align=center| 1–0
| Rachael Ostovich
| TKO (knee to the body and punches)
| Destiny MMA
| 
| align=center|2
| align=center|N/A
| Honolulu, Hawaii
|
|-
|}

References

1983 births
Mixed martial artists from Idaho
American female mixed martial artists
Living people
Strawweight mixed martial artists
Flyweight mixed martial artists
People from Moscow, Idaho
American sportspeople of Chinese descent
21st-century American women